Jofre Carreras Pagès (born 17 June 2001) is a Spanish footballer who plays as a right winger for CD Mirandés, on loan from RCD Espanyol.

Club career
Born in Girona, Catalonia, Carreras joined RCD Espanyol's youth setup in 2014, after representing Girona FC and Grup Excursionista i Esportiu Gironí. He made his senior debut with the reserves on 10 February 2019, coming on as a second-half substitute for Carlos Doncel in a 0–1 Segunda División B home loss against CD Alcoyano.

Carreras renewed his contract with the Pericos on 28 February 2020, signing until 2024. He made his professional debut on 27 September, replacing Fran Mérida in a 2–0 away win against Real Oviedo in the Segunda División.

Carreras made his La Liga debut on 31 December 2021, replacing Aleix Vidal late into a 2–1 away win over Valencia CF. The following 14 August, he further extended his contract until 2026, and was loaned to CD Mirandés in the second division, for one year.

References

External links

2001 births
Living people
Sportspeople from Girona
Spanish footballers
Footballers from Catalonia
Association football wingers
La Liga players
Segunda División players
Segunda División B players
Segunda Federación players
RCD Espanyol B footballers
RCD Espanyol footballers
CD Mirandés footballers